The 10th Armoured Regiment, is an armoured regiment which is part of the Armoured Corps of the Indian Army.

History 
The regiment was raised on 16 April 1984 by Lt Col Kulwant Singh at Ahmednagar with Vijayanta tanks. 

Its first operational assignment however was at Samba, where it took part in Operation Trident in 1986. The regiment has also taken part in Operation Rakshak, Operation Vijay and Operation Parakram. Four Sena Medals and several Commendation Cards have been conferred on the regiment.

The Regiment was presented the ‘President’s Standards’ at Suratgarh on 5 December 2017 by General Bipin Rawat, Chief of the Army Staff, on behalf of the President of India, Mr Ram Nath Kovind

The Regiment is currently equipped with the T-72 tanks.

Regimental Insignia
The cap badge of the unit has crossed lances and pennons, with the numeral '10' at the crossing, mounted with an armoured fist facing right. The regimental motto ('परम धर्म विजय') is inscribed on a scroll below in Devanagari script.

References

Armoured and cavalry regiments of the Indian Army from 1947
Military units and formations established in 1984